The Magistrate may refer to:
 The Magistrate (play), an 1885 farce by Arthur Wing Pinero
 The Magistrate (1921 film), a silent British film adaptation
 The Magistrate (1955 film), a black-and-white Japanese film
 The Magistrate (1959 film), an Italian film by Luigi Zampa
 The Magistrate (miniseries), a 1989 Italian, Australian, and Swiss miniseries

See also
 Magistrate, a civilian officer who administers the law